North Serbia or Northern Serbia may refer to:

 in geography, northern regions of the modern Republic of Serbia
 in medieval history, the Realm of Stefan Dragutin, northern of two Serbian kingdoms at the end of 13th and the beginning of 14th century
 in modern history, the Voivodship of Serbia (1849–1860), northern of two Serbian entities, the other being the Principality of Serbia

See also
 Serbia (disambiguation)
 West Serbia (disambiguation)
 South Serbia (disambiguation)
 East Serbia (disambiguation)